The Santa Ana Regional Transportation Center is a passenger rail station and transportation center in Santa Ana, California. It is used by Amtrak's Pacific Surfliner and Metrolink's Orange County Line and Inland Empire–Orange County Line trains. It is also a Greyhound station and a hub for the Orange County Transportation Authority bus system as well as a terminal for international bus services to Mexico.

History 
When the station opened on September 7, 1985, it was the largest new rail station built in the United States since the completion of the New Orleans Union Passenger Terminal circa 1955. The center was erected on the site of a former Atchison, Topeka and Santa Fe Railway combination depot that had been constructed in 1939 and closed in 1982. The station, which cost approximately $17 million, was funded by the U.S. Department of Transportation, California Department of Transportation, and the city of Santa Ana.

In FY2010 Santa Ana was the 22nd-busiest of Amtrak's 73 California stations, boarding or detraining an average of about 420 passengers daily.

Future service 

Santa Ana Regional Transportation Center will be the eastern terminus of the OC Streetcar, a  streetcar line through Downtown Santa Ana, a major regional employment area, to a new transit center and Park and Ride in Garden Grove at Harbor Boulevard and Westminster Avenue (both major bus corridors).

Design 

The station was designed by the Blurock Partnership architectural firm in the Spanish Colonial Revival and Mediterranean Revival architectural styles to complement the region's older buildings. Features include red barrel roof tiles, arcades, colonnades, exterior walls finished to resemble stucco, and the extensive use of painted tiles for decoration.

Service

Train hours and frequency

Bus services 
 Crucero USA
 Greyhound Lines

In popular culture 
The last scene in the movie Rain Man was filmed at the station. Its exterior and interior appeared in the second season of True Detective in 2015.

References

External links 

 DOT profile of Santa Ana Station
 Santa Ana Amtrak-Metrolink Station (USA RailGuide -- TrainWeb)
 Orange County Transportation Authority

Amtrak stations in Orange County, California
Metrolink stations in Orange County, California
Former Atchison, Topeka and Santa Fe Railway stations in California
Transit centers in the United States
Buildings and structures in Santa Ana, California
Transportation in Santa Ana, California
Mediterranean Revival architecture in California
Spanish Colonial Revival architecture in California
Railway stations in the United States opened in 1985
Railway stations in the United States opened in 1939
1939 establishments in California
1985 establishments in California
Railway stations closed in 1982
1982 disestablishments in California
Bus stations in Orange County, California